André Mangeot is a British poet and short story writer.

He has published four books to date, including two collections of poetry and two of short stories. His work has appeared in The Spectator, New Statesman, Times Literary Supplement and London Magazine, and he has been a member of the poetry collective The Joy of Six.

Mangeot credits traveling widely in the mid-Eighties and early Nineties as a significant influence on his work, as well as the writing of Graham Greene and Paul Theroux.

Born to English parents of French origin, he spent time in Suffolk, Yorkshire and Kent as a child, and attended Oxford University. Mangeot lives near Cambridge, and has done work in charity fundraising in addition to his writing career.

Bibliography

Poetry collections
Natural Causes (2003)
Mixer (2005)

Short Story Collections
A Little Javanese (2008)
True North (2010)

References

 

British poets
21st-century British short story writers
Living people
Year of birth missing (living people)